Swedish Prison and Probation Service is a  Government agency that is part of the Swedish judicial system, tasked with incarcerating suspects during pre-trial and trial and convicts after sentencing. The Main Office of the agency is located in Norrköping.

The agency also handles deportations of individuals not allowed in the country.

See also
 Swedish National Board of Institutional Care
 Escape of Stig Bergling

External links 
www.kriminalvarden.se (Swedish main page, with links to several languages)
 Swedish Prison and Probation Service (in English)
 http://www.aftonbladet.se/nyheter/article17982750.ab

References

Prison and correctional agencies
Prison and Probation Service
Penal system in Sweden
National law enforcement agencies of Sweden